This is a list of flag bearers who have represented Kenya at the Olympics.

Flag bearers carry the national flag of their country at the opening ceremony of the Olympic Games.

See also
Kenya at the Olympics

References

Kenya at the Olympics
Kenya
Olympic flagbearers